Trematocara macrostoma is a species of cichlid endemic to Lake Tanganyika where it is known from the southern portion of the lake.  This species can reach a length of  SL.

References

macrostoma
Fish described in 1952
Taxonomy articles created by Polbot